Africa: The Serengeti is a documentary film directed by George Casey. It was filmed in 70mm on location in Tanzania's Serengeti National Park and Kenya's Masai Mara. This documentary film is narrated by James Earl Jones. It was originally released to IMAX theaters in 1994.

The film features nature cinematography during a year at East Africa's Serengeti plain. The Serengeti is a huge area of grassland in Tanzania. Once a year, in time of drought, animals travel north in order to survive. This "great migration", an event in which millions of wildebeests, zebras, and antelope travel several hundred miles across the plain, while lions and other dangers await them along the way, is considered one of the great wonders of the world.

Hans Zimmer, composer of The Lion King (where Jones lent his voice to Mufasa), contributed to the film soundtrack. Casey followed this film with another nature documentary, Alaska: Spirit of the Wild.

References

External links
 
 Movie Script from  Museum of Science - Boston
 Witnessing the Great Migration on Safari in Serengeti and Masai Mara

1994 short films
1994 films
American documentary films
IMAX short films
Films set in Tanzania
Films set in Africa
Films set in Kenya
1990s English-language films
Documentary films about nature
1994 documentary films
IMAX documentary films
Films scored by Hans Zimmer
Films about lions
Swahili-language films
The Lion King (franchise)
1990s American films